Jayanan Vincent  is an Indian cinematographer. He is the son of cinematographer and director, A. Vincent, and elder brother to Ajayan Vincent. He is known for his work in Malayalam, Telugu, Tamil, and Hindi films and he is a member of the Indian Society of Cinematographers (ISC). He won two Nandi Awards.

Selected filmography

1975 – Jyothi (1976 film) (Telugu)- apprentice, camera department
1976 – Kalpana (Telugu) - apprentice, camera department
1976 – Secretary (1976 film) (Telugu) - apprentice, camera department
1976 – Prema Lekhalu (Telugu) - assistant cameraman
1977 – Adavi Ramudu (1977 film) (Telugu) - assistant cameraman
1977 – Gadusu Pillodu (Telugu) - assistant cameraman
1977 – Agninakshathram (1977 film) (Malayalam) - associate cameraman
1977 – Kannappanunni (Malayalam) - assistant cameraman
1977 – Naam Pirandha Mann (Tamil) - assistant cameraman
1977 – Acharam Ammini Osaram Omana (Malayalam) - camera operator
1977 – Mariamman Thiruvizha (Tamil)
1978 – K D No 1 (Telugu) - assistant cameraman
1978 – Kadathanaattu Maakkam (Malayalam) - assistant cameraman
1978 – Rajaputhra Rahasyamu (Telugu) - associate cameraman
1978 – Radhakrishna (Telugu) - assistant cameraman
1978 – Eetta (Malayalam) - second unit camera
1978 – Anappachan (Malayalam)
1978 – Ente Neelakasham (Malayalam)
1978 – Vayanadan Thampan (Malayalam)
1978 – Nakshathrangale Kaaval (film) (Malayalam) - second unit camera
1979 – Ilamai Kolam (Tamil) - camera operator
1979 – Ezhamkadalinakkare (Malayalam) - second unit camera
1979 – Ore Vaanam Ore Bhoomi (Tamil) - second unit camera
1979 – Allauddinum Albhutha Vilakkum (Malayalam/Tamil) - second unit camera
1979 – Rakthamillatha Manushyan (Malayalam) - second unit camera
1979 – Hridhayathinte Nirangal (Malayalam) - second unit camera
1979 – Pagalil Oru Iravu (Tamil) - second unit camera
1979 – Jimmy (1979 film) (Malayalam)
1979 – Aarattu (Malayalam)
1979 – Veerabhadran (Malayalam)
1979 – Pratheeksha (Malayalam)
1979 – Ivar (1980 film) (Malayalam)
1980 – Bandish (film) (Hindi) - camera operator
1980 – Angadi (film) (Malayalam) - second unit camera
1980 – Pavizha Mutthu (Malayalam) - second unit camera
1980 – Kaanatha Valayam (Malayalam) - second unit camera
1980 – Kaali (1980 Tamil film) (Tamil/Telugu) - second unit camera
1980 – Guru (Tamil/Telugu)
1980 – Krishnapparunthu (Malayalam)
1980 – Ashwaradham (Malayalam)
1980 – Karimpana (Malayalam)
1981 – Sanchari (Malayalam) - second unit camera
1981 – Ashajyothi (Telugu) - camera operator
1981 – Thrishna (Malayalam)
1981 – Ahimsa (1981 film) (Malayalam)
1982 – Archanai Pookal (Tamil)
1982 – Ina (film) (Malayalam)
1982 – Aksharangal (Malayalam)
1982 – Njan Ekananu (Malayalam)
1982 – Theeram Thedunna Thira (Malayalam) 
1982 – Idiyum Minnalum (Malayalam)
1982 – Innalenkil Nale (Malayalam) - second unit camera
1983 – Aanandha Kummi (Tamil) - second unit camera
1983 – Aaroodam (Malayalam)
1983 – Iniyenkilum (Malayalam)
1983 – Rathilayam (Malayalam)
1984 – Athirathram (film) (Malayalam)
1984 – Aksharangal (Malayalam)
1984 – Umaanilayam (Malayalam)
1984 – Aalkkoottathil Thaniye (Malayalam)
1984 – Kanamarayathu (Malayalam)
1984 – Uyarangalil (Malayalam)
1984 – Lakshmana Rekha (film) (Malayalam)
1984 – Arante Mulla Kochu Mulla (Malayalam)
1984 – Adiyozhukkukal (Malayalam)
1984 – Karishma (1984 film) (Hindi)
1984 – Alaya Deepam (Tamil) - second unit camera
1985 – Anu Bandham (Malayalam)
1985 – Manicheppu Thurannappol (Malayalam)
1985 – Ee Thanalil Ithiri Nerum (Malayalam)
1985 – Nirakkoottu(Malayalam)
1985 – Iniyum Kadha Thudarum (Malayalam) - second unit camera
1985 – Pournami Raavil 3D (Malayalam/Tamil) - second unit camera
1986 – Vivahitare Itihile (Malayalam)
1986 – Vartha (Malayalam)
1986 – Rajavinte Makan (Malayalam)
1986 – Adiverukal (Malayalam)
1986 – Shyama (Malayalam)
1986 – Kshamichu Ennoru Vakku (Malayalam)
1986 – Nyayavidhi (Malayalam)
1986 – Udayam Padinjaru (Malayalam)
1986 – Thaaiku Oru Thaalaattu (Tamil)
1987 – Vazhiyorakkazhchakal (Malayalam)
1987 – January Oru Orma (Malayalam)
1987 – Bhoomiyile Rajakkanmar (Malayalam)
1987 – Poovizhi Vasalile (Tamil) - second unit camera
1987 – Thoovanathumbikal (Malayalam) 
1987 – Ithrayum Kalam (Malayalam)
1987 – New Delhi (Malayalam)
1988 – Sangham (1988 film) (Malayalam)
1988 – Manu Uncle (Malayalam)
1988 – Antima Teerpu (1988 film) (Telugu)
1988 – New Delhi (1988 Kannada film) (Kannada)
1988 – Dinarathrangal (Malayalam)
1988 – Thanthram(Malayalam)
1988 – New Delhi (1988 Hindi film) (Hindi)
1988 – David David Mr. David (Malayalam) second unit camera
1989 – Naduvazhikal (Malayalam)
1989 – Douthyam (Malayalam)
1989 – Mahayanam (Malayalam)
1989 – Nair Saab (Malayalam)
1989 – Adavilo Abhimanyudu (Telugu)
1990 – Randam Varavu (Malayalam) - second unit camera
1990 – Marupuram (Malayalam) - second unit camera
1990 – Kanoon Ki Zanjeer (Hindi) - second unit camera
1990 – No.20 Madras Mail (Malayalam)
1990 – Nammude Naadu (Malayalam)
1990 – Kuruppinte Kanakku Pustakom (Malayalam)
1990 – Kuttettan (Malayalam)
1990 – Samrajyam (Malayalam)
1990 – Ee Thanutha Veluppan Kalathu (Malayalam)
1991 – Aathma Bandham (Telugu) - second unit camera
1991 – Uncle Bun (Malayalam)- second unit camera
1991 – Talli Tandrulu (Telugu) - second unit camera
1991 – Pookkalam Varavayi (Malayalam)
1992 – O' Faby (Malayalam)
1992 – Senthamizh Paattu (Tamil)
1992 – Kauravar (Malayalam)
1992 – Kizhakkan Pathrose (Malayalam)
1992 – Soorya Manasam (Malayalam)
1992 – Johnnie Walker (film) (Malayalam) - second unit camera
1993 – Airport (Tamil)
1993 – Udan Pirappu (Tamil)
1993 – Kalaignan (Tamil)
1993 – Angarakshakudu (Telugu)
1994 – Bobbili Simham (Telugu) - second unit camera
1994 – Sainyam (Malayalam)
1995 – Ravan Raaj: A True Story (Hindi)
1995 – Villadhi Villain (Tamil)
1995 – Muthu Kaalai (Tamil)
1996 – Poovarasan (Tamil)
1996 – Jung (1996 film)(Hindi)
1997 – Krishnagudiyil Oru Pranayakalathu (Malayalam) - second unit camera
1997 – Aaraam Thampuran (Malayalam) - second unit camera
1997 – Bhoopathi (1997 film) (Malayalam) - second unit camera
1997 – Gangothri (film) (Malayalam)
1997 – Kodieswaran (Tamil) unreleased
1998 – Udhavikku Varalaamaa (Tamil)
1998 – Premante Idera  (Telugu)
1999 – Ravoyi Chandamama (Telugu)
1999 – F. I. R. (1999 film) (Malayalam) - second unit camera
1999 – Hogi Pyaar Ki Jeet (Hindi) - second unit camera
1999 – Raja Kumarudu (Telugu) - second unit camera
2000 – Bulandi (2000 film) (Hindi) - second unit camera 
2000 – Sradha (Malayalam) 
2000 – Sandhitha Velai (Tamil)
2001 – Bhalevadivi Basu (Telugu)
2001 – Badri (Tamil)
2001 – Friends (2001 film) (Tamil) - second unit camera
2002 – Takkari Donga (Telugu)
2009 – Love 4 Ever (Telugu/Hindi)
2009 – Jag Jeondeyan De Mele (Punjabi) 
2009 – Heer Ranjha: a True Love Story 2009 film (Punjabi)
2010 – Om Shanti (Telugu)
2011 – Teen Maar (Telugu)
2012 – Gabbar Singh (Telugu)
2013 – Balupu (Telugu)
2013 – Baadshah  (Telugu) - second unit camera
2014 – Double Di Trouble (Punjabi) - second unit camera
2014 – Power (Telugu)
2015 – Gopala Gopala (Telugu)
2016 – Sardaar Gabbar Singh (Telugu) - second unit camera
2017 – The Decision (English) 
2019 – Kurukshetra (Kannada)

Awards
Nandi Awards
 Best Cinematographer - Premante Idera
 Best Cinematographer - Takkari Donga

References

External links
 

Malayalam film cinematographers
Indian Christians
Malayali people
Living people
Artists from Kozhikode
Telugu film cinematographers
Tamil film cinematographers
20th-century Indian photographers
21st-century Indian photographers
Cinematographers from Kerala
Year of birth missing (living people)